Jackie J. Reeder (born June 29, 1958) is an American politician in the state of Iowa. A Democrat, she represented the 28th district in the Iowa House of Representatives from 2002 to 2003.

Reeder was born in 1958 in northeastern Iowa, one of ten children. She was a real estate agent; she served as a county supervisor and on the school board. She was elected in a special election on January 22, 2002, to serve the remainder of Steve Falck's term in the 28th district. She served on the appropriations, local government and state government standing committees.

References

1958 births
Living people
Businesspeople from Iowa
Women state legislators in Iowa
County supervisors in Iowa
School board members in Iowa
Democratic Party members of the Iowa House of Representatives
20th-century American politicians
21st-century American politicians
20th-century American women politicians
21st-century American women politicians